This article lists divisions of the Wehrmacht (German Armed Forces) and Waffen-SS active during World War II, including divisions of the Heer (army), Luftwaffe (air force), and the Kriegsmarine (navy).

Upgrades and reorganizations are shown only to identify the variant names for what is notionally a single unit; other upgrades and reorganizations are deferred to the individual articles. Due to the scope of this list, pre-war changes are not shown. Most of these divisions trained in Berlin, which is also where new military technology was kept and tested.

German unit designations
These designations are normally not translated and used in the German form in the unit name or description.
Bodenständige A static unit. Normally assigned to units who were deficient in transport and unable to move their own artillery. Many of these were divisions that had been mauled on the Eastern Front and were sent west to serve as coastal defence garrisons until sufficient resources were available to rehabilitate the division.
Festung Translates to Fortress. A non-standard division used to garrison critical sites. Smaller Festung units may have consisted of only two or three battalions.
Grenadier A traditional term for heavy infantry. it was most often used as a morale-building honorific indicative of reduced strength when used alone.
Jäger A traditional term for light infantry (Translated "Hunter").  Normally provided with horse or motor transport with (usually) lighter artillery weapons and usually smaller size when compared to normal infantry divisions. In many cases the Jäger divisions were mountain divisions referred to as ''Gebirsjäger''. This Jäger description did not apply to the light divisions deployed in Africa (5th, 90th, 164th, 999th), nor to the five light mechanized divisions. 
Gebirgsjäger Traditional term for mountain and ski troops.
Lehr A demonstration/training unit (Translated "Teach").
Nummer Translates to "Number." A "placeholder" name for a division with staff but with few, if any combat assets.  Normally there was no initial type description in the name - this was added when the unit had received its designation of combat assets (i.e. Division Nr. 179 became Panzer Division Nr. 179).
Panzer Armour (Translated "Armoured").
 Sicherungs-Division A Security Division Designed for garrison duties in the rear areas; may consist of two reinforced regiments or of a number of independent battalions.

Sturm "Assault" (Translated "Storm").
Volks "of the People" (Translated "People's").

Volksgrenadier A late-war reorganization with reduced size and increased short-range firepower. Many previously destroyed or badly mauled infantry divisions were reconstituted as Volksgrenadier divisions, and new ones were raised as well. Their fighting worth varied widely depending on unit experience and equipment. 
Volkssturm Translated as "Peoples Militia." A national militia in which units were organized by local Nazi Party leaders and trained by the SS. They were placed under Wehrmacht command in battle.
zbV Abbreviation for "zur besonderen Verwendung" Meaning "Special Purpose" (Translated "For Special Deployment") divisions created to meet special requirements e.g. Division zbV Afrika.

Army (Heer)

Panzer divisions

Numbered panzer divisions
 1st Panzer Division
 2nd Panzer Division
 3rd Panzer Division
 4th Panzer Division
 5th Panzer Division
 6th Panzer Division (previously 1st Light Division)
 7th Panzer Division (previously 2nd Light Division)
 8th Panzer Division (previously 3rd Light Division)
 9th Panzer Division (previously 4th Light Division)
 10th Panzer Division
 11th Panzer Division
 12th Panzer Division (previously 2nd Motorized Infantry Division)
 13th Panzer Division (previously 13th Infantry Division, 13th Motorized Infantry Division; later Panzer Division Feldherrnhalle 2)
 14th Panzer Division (previously 4th Infantry Division)
 15th Panzer Division (previously 33rd Infantry Division; later 15th Panzergrenadier Division)
 16th Panzer Division (previously 16th Infantry Division)
 17th Panzer Division (previously 27th Infantry Division)
 18th Panzer Division (later 18th Artillery Division)
 19th Panzer Division (previously 19th Infantry Division)
 20th Panzer Division
 21st Panzer Division (previously 5th Light Division)
 22nd Panzer Division
 23rd Panzer Division
 24th Panzer Division (previously 1st Cavalry Division)
 25th Panzer Division
 26th Panzer Division (formerly 23rd Infantry Division)
 27th Panzer Division
 116th Panzer Division Windhund (previously 16th Infantry Division, 16th Motorized Infantry Division, and 16th Panzergrenadier Division)
 130th Panzer Division (commonly referred to as Panzer Lehr Division)

 155th Reserve Panzer Division (previously Division Nr. 155, Division Nr. 155 (mot.), Panzer Division Nr. 155)
 Panzer Division Nr. 178 (previously Division Nr. 178)
 179th Reserve Panzer Division (previously Division Nr. 179, Division Nr. 179 (mot.), and Panzer Division Nr. 179)
 232nd Panzer Division (previously Panzer Division Tatra, Panzer Training Division Tatra)
 233rd Reserve Panzer Division (previously Division Nr. 233 (mot.), Panzergrenadier Division Nr. 233, and Panzer Division Nr. 233; later Panzer Division Clausewitz)
 273rd Reserve Panzer Division

Named panzer divisions

 Panzer Division Clausewitz (previously Division Nr. 233 (mot.), Panzergrenadier Division Nr. 233, and Panzer Division Nr. 233, 233rd Reserve Panzer Division)
 Panzer Division Feldherrnhalle 1 (previously 60th Infantry Division, 60th Motorized Infantry Division, and Panzergrenadier Division Feldherrnhalle)
 Panzer Division Feldherrnhalle 2 (previously 13th Infantry Division, 13th Motorized Infantry Division, and 13th Panzer Division)
 Panzer Division Holstein
 Panzer Division Jüterbog
 Panzer Division Kempf (part Heer, part Waffen-SS)
 Panzer Division Kurmark
 Panzer Lehr Division (later 130th Panzer Division)
 Panzer Division Müncheberg

 Panzer Division Döberitz (later Panzer Division Schlesien)
 Panzer Division Tatra (later Panzer Training Division Tatra, 232nd Panzer Division)

Light mechanized divisions

The designation "Light" (leichte in German) had various meanings in the German Army of World War II. There were a series of 5 Light divisions; the first four were pre-war mechanized formations organized for use as mechanized cavalry, and the fifth was an ad hoc collection of mechanized elements rushed to Africa to help the Italians and organized into a division once there. All five were eventually converted to ordinary Panzer divisions.

 1st Light Division (later 6th Panzer Division)
 2nd Light Division (later 7th Panzer Division)
 3rd Light Division (later 8th Panzer Division)
 4th Light Division (later 9th Panzer Division)
 5th Light Afrika Division (later 21st Panzer Division)

Various other divisions were dubbed "Light" for other reasons, and are listed among the Infantry Series Divisions (see below ↓).

Infantry series divisions

The backbone of the Heer was the infantry division. Of the 154 divisions deployed against the Soviet Union in 1941, including reserves, there were 100 infantry, 19 panzer, 11 motorized, 9 security, 5 Waffen-SS, 4 "light", 4 mountain, 1 SS-police, and 1 cavalry. A typical infantry division in June 1941 had 17,734 men organized into the following sub-units: 
three infantry regiments with staff and communications units 
three battalions with: 
three infantry companies
one heavy weapons company
one anti-tank company (mot.) 
one artillery company
one reconnaissance unit 
one tank destroyer battalion with: 
three companies (each with twelve 3.7 cm guns) 
one artillery regiment 
three battalions
three batteries
one pioneer battalion 
one communications unit 
one field replacement battalion 
Supply, medical, veterinary, mail, and police

Infantry divisions were raised in waves (Aufstellungswelle), sets of divisions with a standardized table of organization and equipment. In general the later waves (i.e., the higher-numbered divisions) were of lower quality than the earlier ones.

Numbered divisions
Divisions are listed by number and reflect their lineage where names or designations were changed over time.

1st to 99th 
 1st Infantry Division
 2nd Motorized Infantry Division (later 12th Panzer Division)
 3rd Motorized Infantry Division (later 3rd Panzergrenadier Division)
 4th Infantry Division (later 14th Panzer Division)
 5th Infantry Division (later 5th Light Infantry Division, 5th Jäger Division)
 Not related to the 5th Light Division.
 6th Infantry Division (later 6th Grenadier Division, 6th Volksgrenadier Division)
 7th Infantry Division
 8th Infantry Division (later 8th Light Infantry Division, 8th Jäger Division)
 9th Infantry Division (later 9th Volksgrenadier Division)
 10th Infantry Division (later 10th Motorized Infantry Division, 10th Panzergrenadier Division)
 11th Infantry Division
 12th Infantry Division (later 12th Volksgrenadier Division)
 13th Motorized Infantry Division (later 13th Panzer Division, Panzer Division Feldherrnhalle 2)
 14th Infantry Division (later 14th Motorized Infantry Division, then 14th Infantry Division again)
 14th Luftwaffe Infantry Division
 This unit was originally in the Luftwaffe as the 14th Luftwaffe Field Division.
 15th Infantry Division
 15th Panzergrenadier Division (previously 33rd Infantry Division, 15th Panzer Division)
 Not related to 15th Infantry Division.
 16th Infantry Division (later split into –)
 16th Panzer Division, and
 16th Motorized Infantry Division (later 16th Panzergrenadier Division, 116th Panzer Division)
 16th Luftwaffe Infantry Division (later 16th Volksgrenadier Division) 
 This unit was originally in the Luftwaffe as the 16th Luftwaffe Field Division.
 17th Infantry Division
 18th Infantry Division (later 18th Motorised Infantry Division, 18th Panzergrenadier Division)
 18th Volksgrenadier Division
 Not related to the 18th Infantry Division.
 19th Infantry Division (later 19th Panzer Division)
 19th Grenadier Division (later 19th Volksgrenadier Division)
 This unit was originally in the Luftwaffe as the 19th Luftwaffe Field Division (later 19th Luftwaffe Sturm Division)
 20th Infantry Division (later 20th Motorized Infantry Division, 20th Panzergrenadier Division)
 21st Infantry Division
 22nd Infantry Division (later 22nd Air Landing Division, 22nd Volksgrenadier Division)
 23rd Infantry Division (later 26th Panzer Division)
 After being reorganized as the 26th Panzer Division, some of the 23rd Infantry Division's original components were used to create a new 23rd Infantry Division.
 24th Infantry Division
 25th Infantry Division (later 25th Motorized Infantry Division, 25th Panzergrenadier Division)
 26th Infantry Division (later 26th Volksgrenadier Division)
 27th Infantry Division (later 17th Panzer Division)
 28th Light Infantry Division (later 28th Jäger Division)
 29th Infantry Division (later 29th Motorized Infantry Division, 29th Panzergrenadier Division)
 30th Infantry Division
 31st Infantry Division (later 31st Grenadier Division, 31st Volksgrenadier Division)
 32nd Infantry Division
 33rd Infantry Division (later 15th Panzer Division, 15th Panzergrenadier Division)
 34th Infantry Division
 35th Infantry Division 
 36th Infantry Division (later 36th Motorized Infantry Division, 36th Infantry Division again, 36th Grenadier Division, and 36th Volksgrenadier Division)

 38th Infantry Division
 39th Infantry Division (later 41st Fortress Division, 41st Infantry Division)

 41st Infantry Division (previously 39th Infantry Division, 41st Fortress Division)
 42nd Jäger Division (previously 187th Reserve Division)

 44th Infantry Division (later 44th Reichsgrenadier Division Hoch und Deutschmeister)
 45th Infantry Division (later 45th Grenadier Division, 45th Volksgrenadier Division)
 46th Infantry Division (later 46th Volksgrenadier Division)
 47th Infantry Division (previously Division Nr. 156, 156th Reserve Division; later 47th Volksgrenadier Division)
 48th Infantry Division (previously Division Nr. 171, 171st Reserve Division; later 48th Volksgrenadier Division)
 49th Infantry Division (previously Division Nr. 191, 191st Reserve Division)
 50th Infantry Division (previously Grenzkommandantur Küstrin)
 52nd Infantry Division (later 52nd Field Training Division, 52nd Security Division)
 56th Infantry Division
 57th Infantry Division
 58th Infantry Division
 59th Infantry Division
 60th Infantry Division (later 60th Motorized Infantry Division, Panzergrenadier Division Feldherrnhalle, and Panzer Division Feldherrnhalle 1)
 61st Infantry Division (later 61st Volksgrenadier Division)
 62nd Infantry Division (later 62nd Volksgrenadier Division)
 63rd Infantry Division (planned but not formed)

 64th Infantry Division
 65th Infantry Division

 68th Infantry Division
 69th Infantry Division
70th Infantry Division
 71st Infantry Division
 72nd Infantry Division
 73rd Infantry Division
 74th Infantry Division (planned but not formed)

 75th Infantry Division
 76th Infantry Division
 77th Infantry Division
 78th Infantry Division (later 78th Sturm Division, 78th Grenadier Division, 78th Volksgrenadier Division, and finally 78 Volks-Sturm Division)
 79th Infantry Division (later 79th Volksgrenadier Division)
 80th Infantry Division
 81st Infantry Division
 82nd Infantry Division
 83rd Infantry Division
 84th Infantry Division
 85th Infantry Division
 86th Infantry Division
 87th Infantry Division
 88th Infantry Division
 89th Infantry Division
 90th Light Infantry Division (previously the Division z.b.V. Afrika; later 90th Light Afrika Division, 90th Panzergrenadier Division)
 91st Infantry Division (later 91st Air Landing Division)
 92nd Infantry Division
 93rd Infantry Division
 94th Infantry Division
 95th Infantry Division (later 95th Volksgrenadier Division)
 96th Infantry Division
 97th Light Infantry Division (later 97th Jäger Division)
 98th Infantry Division
 99th Light Infantry Division (later 7th Mountain Division)

100th to 199th 
 100th Light Infantry Division (later 100th Jäger Division)
 101st Light Infantry Division (later 101st Jäger Division)
 102nd Infantry Division

 104th Jäger Division (previously 704th Infantry Division)

 106th Infantry Division

 110th Infantry Division
 111th Infantry Division
 112th Infantry Division
 113th Infantry Division
 114th Jäger Division (previously 714th Infantry Division)
 117th Jäger Division (previously 717th Infantry Division)
 118th Jäger Division (previously 718th Infantry Division)
 121st Infantry Division
 122nd Infantry Division
 123rd Infantry Division
 125th Infantry Division
 126th Infantry Division
 129th Infantry Division
 131st Infantry Division
 132nd Infantry Division
 133rd Fortress Division
 134th Infantry Division
 Division z.b.V. 136
 137th Infantry Division
 Division z.b.V. 140 (previously Shadow Division Steiermark; later 9th Mountain Division)
 Division Nr. 141 (later 141st Reserve Division)
 Division Nr. 143 (later 143rd Reserve Division)
 Division Nr. 147 (later 147th Reserve Division)
 Division Nr. 148 (later 148th Reserve Division, 148th Infantry Division)
 149th Field Training Division (planned but not formed)
 150th Field Training Division (planned but not formed)
 151st Field Training Division (planned but not formed)
 Division Nr. 151 (later 151st Reserve Division)
 152nd Field Training Division (planned but not formed)
 Division Nr. 152
 Division Nr. 153 (later 153rd Reserve Division, 153rd Field Training Division, 153rd Grenadier Division)
 Division Nr. 154 (later 154th Reserve Division, 154th Field Training Division, 154th Infantry Division)
 Division Nr. 155 (later Division Nr. 155 (mot.), Panzer Division Nr. 155, 155th Reserve Panzer Division)
 155th Field Training Division (later 155th Infantry Division)
 Not related to Division Nr. 155.
 Division Nr. 156 (later 156th Reserve Division, 47th Infantry Division, 47th Volksgrenadier Division)

 156th Field Training Division (later 156th Infantry Division)
 Not related to Division Nr. 156
 Division Nr. 157 (later 157th Reserve Division, 157th Mountain Division, 8th Mountain Division)
 Division Nr. 158 (later 158th Reserve Division)
 158th Infantry Division
 Not related to Division Nr. 158.
 Division Nr. 159 (later 159th Reserve Division, 159th Infantry Division)
 Division Nr. 160 (later 160th Reserve Division, 160th Infantry Division)
 161st Infantry Division
 162nd Infantry Division (later 162nd Turkoman Division, with foreign troops)
 163rd Infantry Division
 164th Infantry Division (later Fortress Division Kreta, which split into –)
 Fortress Brigade Kreta
 164th Light Afrika Division
 Division Nr. 165 (later 165th Reserve Division)
 Division Nr. 166 (later 166th Reserve Division, 166th Infantry Division)
 167th Infantry Division (later 585th Volksgrenadier Division, 167th Volksgrenadier Division)
 168th Infantry Division
 169th Infantry Division
 170th Infantry Division
 Division Nr. 171 (later 171st Reserve Division, 48th Infantry Division, 48th Volksgrenadier Division)
 Division Nr. 172 (later 172nd Reserve Division)
 Division Nr. 173 (later 173rd Reserve Division)
 Division Nr. 174 (later 174th Reserve Division)
 Division Nr. 176 (later 176th Infantry Division)
 Division Nr. 177
 Division Nr. 178 (later Division Nr. 178 (mot.)
 180th Infantry Division
 181st Infantry Division
 Division Nr. 182 (later 182nd Reserve Division, 182nd Infantry Division)
 183rd Infantry Division (later 564th Volksgrenadier Division, 183rd Volksgrenadier Division)
 187th Reserve Division (later 42nd Jäger Division)
 Division Nr. 188 (later 188th Reserve Mountain Division, 188th Mountain Division)
 189th Reserve Division (later 189th Infantry Division)
 190th Infantry Division
 Division Nr. 191 (later 191st Reserve Division, 49th Infantry Division)
 196th Infantry Division
 197th Infantry Division
 198th Infantry Division
 199th Infantry Division

201st to 299th 
 201st Security Division
 203rd Security Division (later 203rd Infantry Division)
 205th Infantry Division (previously Grenzschutz Abschnittskommando Freiburg, 14th Landwehr Division)
 206th Infantry Division
 207th Infantry Division (later split into –)
 207th Security Division, 281st Security Division, and
 286th Security Division

 208th Infantry Division
 209th Infantry Division
 210th Coastal Defense Division
 211th Infantry Division (later 211th Volksgrenadier Division)
 212th Infantry Division (later 578th Volksgrenadier Division, then renamed 212th Volksgrenadier Division)
 213th Infantry Division (later split into –)
 213th Security Division, 286th Security Division, and
 403rd Security Division
 214th Infantry Division
 215th Infantry Division
 216th Infantry Division
 217th Infantry Division
 218th Infantry Division
 219th Infantry Division
 221st Infantry Division (later split into –)
 221st Security Division, 444th Security Division, and
 454th Security Division
 223rd Infantry Division
 225th Infantry Division
 226th Infantry Division
 227th Infantry Division
 228th Infantry Division
 230th Coastal Defense Division (previously Küstenschutzverband Alta)
 231st Infantry Division
 232nd Infantry Division
 233rd Motorized Division (later 233rd Panzergrenadier Division)
 237th Infantry Division
 239th Infantry Division
 240th Infantry Division z.b.V. (later LXXXVIII Army Corps)
 242nd Infantry Division (previously Division A)
 243rd Static Infantry Division (previously Division B)
 244th Infantry Division (previously Division E)
 245th Infantry Division (previously Division D)
 246th Infantry Division (later 565th Volksgrenadier Division, 246th Volksgrenadier Division)
 249th Infantry Division
 250th Infantry Division (División Azul, the Spanish "Blue" Division in German service)
 251st Infantry Division
 252nd Infantry Division
 253rd Infantry Division
 254th Infantry Division
 255th Infantry Division
 256th Infantry Division (Later 256th Volksgrenadier Division)
 257th Infantry Division (Later 257th Volksgrenadier Division)
 258th Infantry Division
 260th Infantry Division
 262nd Infantry Division
 263rd Infantry Division
 264th Infantry Division
 265th Infantry Division
 266th Infantry Division
 267th Infantry Division
 268th Infantry Division
 269th Infantry Division
 270th Fortress Infantry Division
 271st Infantry Division (later 271st Volksgrenadier Division)
 272nd Infantry Division (later 272nd Volksgrenadier Division)
 273rd Infantry Division
 274th Infantry Division
 275th Infantry Division
 276th Infantry Division (later 276th Volksgrenadier Division)
 277th Infantry Division (later 277th Volksgrenadier Division)
 278th Infantry Division
 279th Infantry Division
 280th Infantry Division
 281st Security Division (previously 207th Infantry Division; later 281st Infantry Division)
 282nd Infantry Division
 285th Security Division
 286th Security Division (previously 207th Infantry Division and 213th Infantry Division; later 286th Infantry Division)
 286th Training Division (planned but not formed)
 290th Infantry Division
 291st Infantry Division
 292nd Infantry Division
 293rd Infantry Division
 294th Infantry Division
 295th Infantry Division (later 295th Static Infantry Division)
 296th Infantry Division
 297th Infantry Division
 298th Infantry Division
 299th Infantry Division

300th to 999th 
 300th Special Infantry Division
 Division z.b.V. 300
 Not related to 300th Special Infantry Division
 301st Infantry Division
 302nd Static Infantry Division (later 302nd Infantry Division)
 304th Infantry Division
 305th Infantry Division
 306th Infantry Division
 309th Infantry Division (later Infantry Division Berlin)
 311th Infantry Division 
 319th Static Infantry Division
 320th Infantry Division (later 320th Volksgrenadier Division)
 321st Infantry Division
 323rd Infantry Division
 324th Infantry Division
 325th Infantry Division Jütland
 325th Security Division
 Not related to 325th Infantry Division Jütland
 326th Infantry Division (later 326th Volksgrenadier Division)
 327th Infantry Division
 328th Infantry Division
 329th Infantry Division
 330th Infantry Division
 331st Infantry Division
 Division z.b.V. 331
 Not related to 331st Infantry Division
 332nd Static Infantry Division (later 332nd Infantry Division)
 333rd Infantry Division
 334th Infantry Division
 335th Infantry Division
 336th Infantry Division
 337th Infantry Division
 337th Volksgrenadier Division (previously 570th Volksgrenadier Division)
 Not related to 337th Infantry Division
 338th Infantry Division
 339th Infantry Division
 340th Infantry Division (later 572nd Volksgrenadier Division, 340th Volksgrenadier Division)
 342nd Infantry Division
 343rd Infantry Division
 344th Static Infantry Division (later 344th Infantry Division)
 345th Motorized Infantry Division
 346th Infantry Division
 347th Infantry Division (later 347th Volksgrenadier Division)
 348th Infantry Division
 349th Infantry Division
 351st Infantry Division (previously Oberfeldkommandantur 587)
 352nd Infantry Division (later 581st Volksgrenadier Division, 352nd Volksgrenadier Division)
 353rd Infantry Division
 355th Infantry Division
 356th Infantry Division
 357th Infantry Division
 358th Infantry Division (previously Stab Oberfeldkommandantur 540 Kielce)
 359th Infantry Division
 361st Infantry Division (later 569th Volksgrenadier Division, 361st Volksgrenadier Division)
 362nd Infantry Division
 363rd Infantry Division (later 566th Volksgrenadier Division, 363rd Volksgrenadier Division)
 364th Infantry Division
 365th Infantry Division (previously Stab Oberfeldkommandantur Tarnow)
 367th Infantry Division
 369th (Croatian) Infantry Division (previously Infantry Regiment 369 (Croatian)
 370th Infantry Division
 371st Infantry Division
 372nd Infantry Division (previously Stab Oberfeldkommandantur 581)
 373rd (Croatian) Infantry Division
 376th Infantry Division
 377th Infantry Division
 379th Infantry Division (previously Division z.b.V. 424)
 381st Field Training Division
 382nd Field Training Division
 383rd Infantry Division
 384th Infantry Division
 385th Infantry Division
 386th Infantry Division (previously Stab Oberfeldkommandantur 530 Warschau)
 386th Motorized Infantry Division
 Not related to 386th Infantry Division
 387th Infantry Division
 388th Field Training Division (later Field Training Division Nord, Field Training Division Kurland and Infantry Division Kurland)
 389th Infantry Division
 390th Field Training Division (later 390th Security Division)
 391st Field Training Division (later 391st Security Division)
 392nd (Croatian) Infantry Division (previously Aufstellungsstab Neuhammer)
 393rd Infantry Division (previously Division z.b.V. 423)
 394th Field Training Division (planned but not formed)
 395th Infantry Division (previously Grenzschutz Abschnittskommando 15, 521st Infantry Division)
 399th Infantry Division (previously Division z.b.V. 421)
 Division z.b.V. 401 (previously Division z.b.V. 422; Later Division Nr. 401)
 Division z.b.V. 402 (later Division Nr. 402)
 402nd Training Division
 Not related to Division z.b.V. 402
 403rd Security Division (previously Division z.b.V. 403)
 Division z.b.V. 404 (later Division Nr. 404, 404th Replacement Training Division)
 Division z.b.V. 405 (later Division Nr. 405)
 Division z.b.V. 406
 Division z.b.V. 407 (later Division Nr. 407)
 Division z.b.V. 408 (later Division Nr. 408)
 Division z.b.V. 409 (later Division Nr. 409)
 Division z.b.V. 410
 Division z.b.V. 411
 Division z.b.V. 412 (previously Division z.b.V. 445)
 Division z.b.V. 413
 Division Nr. 413
 Not related to Division z.b.V. 413
 416th Infantry Division
 Division z.b.V. 417
 Division Nr. 418
 Division z.b.V. 421 (later 399th Infantry Division)
 Division z.b.V. 422 (later Division z.b.V. 401, Division Nr. 401)
 Division z.b.V. 423 (later 393rd Infantry Division)
 Division z.b.V. 424 (later 379th Infantry Division)
 Division z.b.V. 425 (later Kommandeur der Ersatztruppen 100)
 Division z.b.V. 426 (later 556th Infantry Division)
 Division z.b.V. 427 (later 557th Infantry Division)
 Division z.b.V. 428
 Division z.b.V. 429
 430th Infantry Division z.b.V.
 Division z.b.V. 431
 Division z.b.V. 432 (later Division Nr. 432)
 433rd Motorized Replacement Division (previously Division Nr. 433)
 Division Nr. 438
 Division z.b.V. 441 (later 554th Infantry Division)
 Division z.b.V. 442
 Division z.b.V. 443 (later 555th Infantry Division)
 444th Security Division (previously Division z.b.V. 444)
 Division z.b.V. 445 (later Division z.b.V. 412)
 454th Security Division (previously Division z.b.V. 454)
 Division z.b.V. 460
 Division Nr. 461
 Division Nr. 462 (previously Division Nanzig; later 462nd Infantry Division, 462nd Volksgrenadier Division)
 Division Nr. 463
 Division Nr. 464 (later 464th Training Division)
 Division Nr. 465
 Division Nr. 466
 Division Nr. 467 (later Training Division Bayern)
 Division Nr. 469
 Division Nr. 471
 Division Nr. 476
 Division Nr. 480
 Division Nr. 487
 Division Nr. 490
 521st Infantry Division (previously Grenzschutz Abschnittskommando 15; later 395th Infantry Division)
 526th Infantry Division (previously Grenzschutz Abschnittskommando 9; later Division Aachen, Division Nr. 526 Aachen and 526th Reserve Division)
 Division z.b.V. 537 (previously Grenzschutz Abschnittskommando 10)
 Division z.b.V. 538 (previously Grenzschutz Abschnittskommando 20)
 538th Frontier Guard Division
 Not related to Division z.b.V. 538
 Division z.b.V. 539 (previously Landesschützen Kommandeur 1)
 Division z.b.V. 540 (previously Landesschützen Kommandeur 2)
 541st Grenadier Division (later 541st Volksgrenadier Division)
 542nd Infantry Division (later 542nd Grenadier Division, 542nd Volksgrenadier Division)
 543rd Grenadier Division
 544th Grenadier Division (later 544th Volksgrenadier Division)
 545th Grenadier Division (later 545th Volksgrenadier Division)
 546th Grenadier Division
 547th Grenadier Division (later 547th Volksgrenadier Division)
 548th Grenadier Division (later 548th Volksgrenadier Division)
 549th Grenadier Division (later 549th Volksgrenadier Division)
 550th Grenadier Division
 551st Grenadier Division (later 551st Volksgrenadier Division)
 552nd Grenadier Division
 553rd Grenadier Division (later 553rd Volksgrenadier Division)
 554th Infantry Division (previously Division z.b.V. 441)
 555th Infantry Division (previously Division z.b.V. 443)
 556th Infantry Division (previously Division z.b.V. 426)
 557th Infantry Division (previously Division z.b.V. 427)
 558th Grenadier Division (later 558th Volksgrenadier Division)
 559th Grenadier Division (later 559th Volksgrenadier Division)
 560th Grenadier Division (later 560th Volksgrenadier Division)

 561st Grenadier Division Ostpreußen 1 (later 561st Volksgrenadier Division)
 562nd Grenadier Division Ostpreußen 2 (later 562nd Volksgrenadier Division)
 563rd Grenadier Division (previously Grenadier-Lehr Division; later 563rd Volksgrenadier Division)
 564th Grenadier Division (later 564th Volksgrenadier Division)
 565th Volksgrenadier Division (previously 246th Infantry Division; later 246th Volksgrenadier Division)
 566th Volksgrenadier Division (previously 363rd Infantry Division; later 363rd Volksgrenadier Division)
 567th Volksgrenadier Division
 568th Volksgrenadier Division
 569th Volksgrenadier Division
 570th Volksgrenadier Division
 571st Volksgrenadier Division
 572nd Volksgrenadier Division
 573rd Volksgrenadier Division
 574th Volksgrenadier Division
 575th Volksgrenadier Division
 576th Volksgrenadier Division
 577th Volksgrenadier Division
 578th Volksgrenadier Division (previously 212th Infantry Division; later 212th Volksgrenadier Division)
 579th Volksgrenadier Division
 580th Volksgrenadier Division
 581st Volksgrenadier Division (previously 352nd Infantry Division; later 352nd Volksgrenadier Division)
 582nd Volksgrenadier Division
 583rd Volksgrenadier Division
 584th Volksgrenadier Division
 585th Volksgrenadier Division
 586th Volksgrenadier Division
 587th Volksgrenadier Division
 588th Volksgrenadier Division
 600th (Russian) Infantry Division
 Division z.b.V. 601
 Division z.b.V. 602
 Division z.b.V. 603
 Division z.b.V. 604
 Division z.b.V. 605 (previously Festungs Kommandeur Lötzen)
 Division z.b.V. 606 (later 606th Infantry Division)
 Division z.b.V. 607 (later Festungskommandant Pillau)
 Division z.b.V. 608
 Division z.b.V. 609
 Division z.b.V. 610
 Division z.b.V. 611
 Division z.b.V. 612 (later Corps Oder)
 Division z.b.V. 613
 Division z.b.V. 614
 Division z.b.V. 615
 Division z.b.V. 616
 Division z.b.V. 617
 Division z.b.V. 618
 Division z.b.V. 619

 650th (Russian) Infantry Division
 702nd Infantry Division (previously 702nd Static Infantry Division)
 703rd Infantry Division
 704th Infantry Division (later 104th Jäger Division)
 707th Infantry Division (later 707th Security Division)
 708th Infantry Division (later 708th Coastal Defense Division, 573rd Volksgrenadier Division, 708th Volksgrenadier Division)
 709th Static Infantry Division
 710th Infantry Division
 711th Infantry Division
 712th Infantry Division
 713th Infantry Division
 714th Infantry Division (later 114th Jäger Division)
 715th Infantry Division

 716th Static Infantry Division (later 716th Volksgrenadier Division)
 717th Infantry Division (later 117th Jäger Division)
 718th Infantry Division (later 118th Jäger Division)
 719th Infantry Division
 Division Nr. 805
 Division Nr. 905 (previously Division ''von Witzleben'')
 999th Light Afrika Division (previously Afrika Brigade 999)

Named divisions

 Führer Begleit Division (previously Führer Begleit Battalion, Führer begleit brigade)
 Führer Grenadier Division (previously Führer Grenadier Battalion, Führer Grenadier Brigade)
 Panzergrenadier Division Brandenburg (previously Brandenburg Battalion, Brandenburg Regiment and Infantry Division Brandenburg)
 Panzergrenadier Division Feldherrnhalle (previously 60th Infantry Division, 60th Motorized Infantry Division; later Panzer Division Feldherrnhalle 1)
 Panzergrenadier Division Großdeutschland (previously Wachregiment Berlin, Infantry Regiment Großdeutschland and Motorized Infantry Division Großdeutschland)
 Grenadier Lehr Division (later 563rd Grenadier Division, 563rd Volksgrenadier Division)
 Sturm Division Rhodos (previously Sturmbrigade Rhodos)
 Jäger Division Alpen
 Division A (later 242nd Infantry Division)
 Division B (later 243rd Infantry Division)
 Division C
 Division D (later 245th Infantry Division)
 Division E (later 244th Infantry Division)
 Division Aachen
 Division Baltzer
 Division Brand
 Division Nanzig (later Division Nr. 462, 462nd Infantry Division, 462nd Volksgrenadier Division)
 Division Rässler
 Division ''von Broich/von Manteuffel''
 Division von Witzleben (later Division Nr. 905)
 Division z.b.V. (L)
 Division z.b.V. (M)
 Freiwilligen-Stamm Division
 Infantry Division Berlin (previously 309th Infantry Division)
 Infantry Division Döberitz
 Infantry Division ''Ferdinand von Schill''
 Infantry Division Hamburg
 Infantry Division Seeland
 Shadow Division Breslau
 Shadow Division Böhmen (later 237th Infantry Division)
 Shadow Division Dresden
 Shadow Division Schlesien
 Shadow Division Ostpreußen
 Sardinian Infantry Division

Landwehr divisions 

 14th Landwehr Division (previously Grenzschutz Abschnittskommando Freiburg; later 205th Infantry Division)
 97th Landwehr Division (planned but not formed)

Mountain divisions 

 1st Mountain Division (previously Mountain Brigade; later 1st Volksgebirgs Division)
 2nd Mountain Division
 3rd Mountain Division
 4th Mountain Division
 5th Mountain Division
 6th Mountain Division
 7th Mountain Division (previously 99th Light Infantry Division)
 8th Mountain Division (previously Division Nr. 157, 157th Reserve Division, 157th Mountain Division)
 9th Mountain Division (previously Shadow Division Steiermark, Division zbV 140)
 188th Mountain Division (previously Division Nr. 188, 188th Reserve Mountain Division)

Ski division

 1st Ski Division (previously 1st Ski Brigade)

Cavalry divisions

According to Davies, the Cavalry divisions were mounted infantry and the Cossack divisions were "true cavalry", modelled on the Russian cavalry divisions.

 1st Cavalry Division (previously 1st Cavalry Brigade; later 24th Panzer Division)
 3rd Cavalry Division (previously Cavalry Regiment Mitte, 3rd Cavalry Brigade)
 4th Cavalry Division (previously 4th Cavalry Brigade)
 Cossack Cavalry Division (This Division was transferred to the Waffen-SS, where it was split to form the 1st & 2nd Cossack Cavalry Divisions)

Artillery divisions

 18th Artillery Division (previously 18th Panzer Division)
 309th Artillery Division
 310th Artillery Division
 311th Artillery Division
 312th Artillery Division
 397th Artillery Division

Named fortress divisions

 Fortress Division Breslau
 Fortress Division Danzig
 Fortress Division Frankfurt/Oder
 Fortress Division Gotenhafen
 Fortress Division Kreta (previously 164th Infantry Division; later 164th Light Afrika Division)
 Fortress Division Stettin
 Fortress Division Swinemünde
 Fortress Division Warschau

Named training divisions

 Training Division Bayern (previously Division Nr. 467)
 Field Training Division Nord (previously 388th Field Training Division; later Field Training Division Kurland)

RAD divisions

In 1945 the Reichsarbeitsdienst (Reich Labour Service) transferred personnel to the army to form new divisions as part of the 35th Aufstellungswelle, the last of the war.

RAD-Division Nr. 1 Schlageter
RAD-Division Nr. 2 Friedrich Ludwig Jahn
RAD-Division Nr. 3 Theodor Körner
RAD-Division Nr. 4 Güstrow

Field replacement divisions

 Field Replacement Division A
 Field Replacement Division B
 Field Replacement Division C
 Field Replacement Division D
 Field Replacement Division E
 Field Replacement Division F

Navy (Kriegsmarine)

Marine divisions
 1st Marine Division
 2nd Marine Division
 3rd Marine Division
 11th Marine Division
 16th Marine Division
 Marine Division Gotenhafen

Air Force (Luftwaffe)

Hermann Göring divisions

The Hermann Göring formations grew from a single police detachment to an entire armored corps over the course of the war. The later epithet Fallschirm ("parachute") was purely honorific.

 Hermann Göring Division (later Panzer Division Hermann Göring, 1st Parachute Panzer Division Hermann Göring)
 Parachute Panzergrenadier Division 2 Hermann Göring

Airborne divisions

To keep its existence secret, the first German airborne division was named as if a Flieger ("flier") division in the series of Luftwaffe divisions that controlled air assets rather than ground troops-named 7th Flieger Division (often translated 7th Air Division - which see: 1st Parachute Division (Germany)) The division was later reorganized to start a series of nominally airborne divisions. Though named Fallschirmjäger ("paratrooper") divisions, only some of them participated in airdrops in the early part of the war, and in practice most operated as ordinary infantry throughout their existence. The lower-numbered ones earned and maintained an elite status, but quality generally declined among the higher-numbered divisions.

 1st Parachute Division (Previously 7th Flieger Division)
 2nd Parachute Division
 3rd Parachute Division
 4th Parachute Division
 5th Parachute Division
 6th Parachute Division
 7th Parachute Division (previously Group Erdmann)
 8th Parachute Division
 9th Parachute Division
 10th Parachute Division
 11th Parachute Division (started to be formed March 1945. fought as battle groups only)
 20th Parachute Division (Formation ordered March 1945 in the Netherlands, from Parachute Training and Replacement Division. However formation was not completed beyond cadre.)
 21st Parachute Division (Formation ordered April 1945 in the Netherlands, as a Field-Training Division. However formation was not completed beyond cadre.)

Field divisions

Luftwaffe Field Divisions were ordinary infantry divisions organized from Luftwaffe personnel made available after mid-war due to problems with manpower. They were originally Luftwaffe units but were later handed over to the Heer, retaining their numbering but with Luftwaffe attached to distinguish them from similarly numbered divisions already existing in the Heer.

 1st Luftwaffe Field Division (previously Flieger Regiment 10)
 2nd Luftwaffe Field Division
 3rd Luftwaffe Field Division
 4th Luftwaffe Field Division (previously Flieger Regiment 14)
 5th Luftwaffe Field Division (previously Flieger Regiment 16)
 6th Luftwaffe Field Division (previously Flieger Regiment 21)
 7th Luftwaffe Field Division
 8th Luftwaffe Field Division (previously Flieger Regiment 42)
 9th Luftwaffe Field Division (previously Flieger Regiment 62)
 10th Luftwaffe Field Division (previously Flieger Regiment 72)
 11th Luftwaffe Field Division (previously Flieger Regiment 31)
 12th Luftwaffe Field Division (previously Flieger Regiment 12)
 13th Luftwaffe Field Division (previously Flieger Regiment 13)
 14th Luftwaffe Field Division (previously Flieger Regiment 61)
 15th Luftwaffe Field Division
 16th Luftwaffe Field Division
 Eventually transferred to the Heer as 16th Luftwaffe Infantry Division (later 16th Volksgrenadier Division)
 17th Luftwaffe Field Division
 18th Luftwaffe Field Division (previously Flieger Regiment 52)
 19th Luftwaffe Field Division (later 19th Luftwaffe Sturm Division)
 Eventually transferred to the Heer as 19th Grenadier Division (later 19th Volksgrenadier Division)
 20th Luftwaffe Field Division (previously Flieger Regiment 23 later; 20th Luftwaffe Sturm Division)
 21st Luftwaffe Field Division (previously Luftwaffe Division Meindl)
 22nd Luftwaffe Field Division (not formed, its sub-units were attached to other divisions)

Training divisions

 1st Luftwaffe Training Division
 Parachute Training and Replacement Division (see 20th Parachute Division)

Anti-Aircraft divisions

These were headquarters for controlling aggregates of flak ("anti-aircraft artillery") assets rather than ordinary combined arms divisions organized for ground combat.

 1st Anti-Aircraft Division
 2nd Anti-Aircraft Division
 3rd Anti-Aircraft Division
 4th Anti-Aircraft Division
 5th Anti-Aircraft Division
 6th Anti-Aircraft Division
 7th Anti-Aircraft Division
 8th Anti-Aircraft Division
 9th Anti-Aircraft Division
 10th Anti-Aircraft Division
 11th Anti-Aircraft Division
 12th Anti-Aircraft Division
 13th Anti-Aircraft Division
 14th Anti-Aircraft Division
 15th Anti-Aircraft Division
 16th Anti-Aircraft Division
 17th Anti-Aircraft Division
 18th Anti-Aircraft Division
 19th Anti-Aircraft Division
 20th Anti-Aircraft Division
 21st Anti-Aircraft Division
 22nd Anti-Aircraft Division
 23rd Anti-Aircraft Division
 24th Anti-Aircraft Division
 25th Anti-Aircraft Division
 26th Anti-Aircraft Division
 27th Anti-Aircraft Division
 28th Anti-Aircraft Division
 29th Anti-Aircraft Division
 30th Anti-Aircraft Division
 31st Anti-Aircraft Division

Waffen-SS (Schutzstaffel)

All divisions in the Waffen-SS were ordered in a single series up to 38th, regardless of type. Those tagged with nationalities were at least nominally recruited from those nationalities. Many of the higher-numbered units were small battle groups (Kampfgruppen), i.e. divisions in name only.

Also Panzer Division Kempf, a temporary unit of mixed Heer and Waffen-SS components.

See also 
 List of German Army Groups in WWII
 List of German corps in World War II
 List of German brigades in World War II
 List of World War II military units of Germany

References

Footnotes

Bibliography

 Astel, John; Goodwin, A. E.; Long, Jason, Bengtsson, Sven Ake; & Parmenter, James D. (1998). "Orders of Battle". Data booklet from the Europa game Storm Over Scandinavia. Grinnel, Iowa: Game Research/Design. .
 
 
 Parada, George (2004). "Panzer Divisions 1940-1945". Retrieved April 1, 2005.
 Yeide, Harry;(2004). The Tank Killers, A History of America's World War II Tank Destroyer Force. (pg. 209). Casemate Publishers, Havertown, PA. .

 
German divisions
Army
Wor
Divisions
Lists of divisions (military formations)
Infantry divisions of Germany during World War II